Finlay Brewis (born 10 February 2000 in New Zealand) is a New Zealand rugby union player who plays for Canterbury. His playing position is prop.

Reference list

External links
 

2000 births
New Zealand rugby union players
Living people
Rugby union props
Canterbury rugby union players
Crusaders (rugby union) players
Rugby union players from Canterbury, New Zealand